King Stanley can refer to:

Stanley King, a US college president.
King's Stanley, a village in Gloucestershire, UK.
Holders of the title King of Mann:
John I Stanley of the Isle of Man
John II Stanley of the Isle of Man
Thomas Stanley, 1st Baron Stanley
Thomas Stanley, 1st Earl of Derby